State Highway 87 (SH-87) is a  state highway in  Fremont County, Idaho, United States, that connects U.S. Route 20 (US-20) in Island Park with Montana Highway 87 (MT 87) at the Montana state line.

Route description
SH-87 begins at a T intersection with US-20 in northern Island Park, just east of the Henrys Lake Airport. The highway proceeds northwest, traveling through rural area, before bending west and entering the small community of Island Park. The highway travels parallel to the northern shore of Henrys Lake for a short distance, before peeling off and proceeding northwest. The road continues northwest through rural area, before terminating at the southern terminus of MT 87 at the Idaho-Montana state line in Raynolds Pass on the Continental Divide. MT 87 continues northward from the border through Missouri Flats to its northern terminus at a junction with U.S. Route 287.

Major intersections

See also

 List of state highways in Idaho

References

External links

087
Transportation in Fremont County, Idaho